= Cubamar =

Cuban musical trio

- Origin: Cuba
- Genres: Son

Cubamar is a Cuban musical trio. They play a style of music called son.

== Discography ==
- Cantinero de Cuba (1999). Produced and mixed by Daisuke Hinata. (Platinum Entertainment/Intersound/Global Disc Records).
- Havana Blend Tradicional (2008).
- Havana Blend Exotica (2008).
- Rhythm and Smoke: The Cuba Sessions) (2004)
